State Route 213 (SR 213) is a state highway in the U.S. state of California, in Los Angeles County. The California State Legislature has designated the route as Western Avenue from 25th Street in San Pedro north to the San Diego Freeway (Interstate 405) in Torrance. From 25th Street to Carson Street, the California Transportation Commission has officially adopted Western Avenue as a state highway. The northerly two miles from Carson Street to Interstate 405 has not yet been adopted and remains a city street. Beyond Interstate 405, Western Avenue, continues through Torrance, Gardena, and Los Angeles to Los Feliz Boulevard in Hollywood as a city street.

Route description
The signed southern terminus of SR 213 begins at the intersection of Western Avenue with Paseo del Mar at Royal Palms County Beach next to the Pacific Ocean. From here, SR 213 follows Western Avenue northeast along the edge of White Point Park to its intersection with 25th Street, where the legal definition of SR 213 begins. The route continues through San Pedro before briefly entering Rancho Palos Verdes and passing by a naval reservation. Western Avenue then enters Lomita before returning to the Los Angeles city limits in the community of Harbor City. SR 213 intersects with SR 1 before forming the eastern boundary of the city of Torrance and the western boundary of Harbor Gateway. SR 213 intersects with Carson Street and meets its legislative northern terminus; however, SR 213 is signed for a few more miles north to I-405, where the signage ends.

SR 213 is part of the National Highway System, a network of highways that are considered essential to the country's economy, defense, and mobility by the Federal Highway Administration.

History
Route 291 was defined by the California State Legislature as a highway from 25th Street in San Pedro to Route 158, along Western Avenue. The route was redesignated as SR 213 in the 1964 state highway renumbering from 25th Street to I-405.

Major intersections

See also

References

External links

California @ AARoads.com - State Route 213
Caltrans: Route 213 highway conditions
California Highways: SR 213

213
State Route 213
San Pedro, Los Angeles
213
Transportation in Torrance, California